The Blue EP may refer to:

 The Blue EP (Great White EP), 1991
 The Blue EP (Spy Glass Blue EP), 2003
 Blue, a 2006 EP by Bamboo Shoots
 The Blue EP (Death Cab for Cutie EP), 2019
 Powderfinger (EP), also known as Blue EP

See also 
 The Blue (disambiguation)